The Sins of Ilsa (also known as, The Iris Movie) is a 1985 American adult erotic film, based on a novel by Iris Murdoch, that was filmed in New York City and, for exteriors, in  Paris. The film is notable as the last film directed by Radley Metzger and, as of November 2019, has not yet been released publicly.

The film was made during the Golden Age of Porn (1969–1984) (inaugurated by the 1969 release of Andy Warhol Blue Movie) in the United States, at a time of "porno chic", in which adult erotic films were just beginning to be widely released, publicly discussed by celebrities (like Johnny Carson and Bob Hope) and taken seriously by film critics (like Roger Ebert).

According to one film reviewer, Radley Metzger's films, including those made during the Golden Age of Porn (1969–1984), are noted for their "lavish design, witty screenplays, and a penchant for the unusual camera angle". Another reviewer noted that his films were "highly artistic — and often cerebral ... and often featured gorgeous cinematography". Film and audio works by Metzger have been added to the permanent collection of the Museum of Modern Art (MoMA) in New York City.

Plot
Sue (originally, Joanie), a New York City journalist, is attempting to write an article about Ilsa (originally, Iris), a former erotic star who had lived in Paris, but who is currently in retirement and, initially unbeknown to Sue, who had earlier traveled to Pars to interview Ilsa, now living in New York City.

Cast

 Helga Sven ... Ilsa (originally, Iris)
 Sharon Moran ... Sue (originally, Joanie) 
 Laine Michaels
 Stephanie Sinclair
 Theresa Wells 
 George Cleveland

See also

 Erotic art
 Erotic films in the United States
 Erotic photography
 List of American films of 1985
 Sex in film

References

Further reading
 
 Heffernan, Kevin, "A social poetics of pornography", Quarterly Review of Film and Video, Volume 15, Issue 3, December 1994, pp. 77–83. .
 Lehman, Peter, Pornography: film and culture, Rutgers depth of field series, Rutgers University Press, 2006, .
 Williams, Linda, Hard core: power, pleasure, and the "frenzy of the visible", University of California Press, 1999, .

External links
 The Sins of Ilsa – film history

American erotic films
Films directed by Radley Metzger
1985 films
1980s pornographic films
Films shot in New York City
Films set in New York City
Films shot in Paris
Films set in Paris
1980s English-language films
1980s American films